Qezeljeh or Qezeljah or Qezelejeh or Qezelejah, also rendered as Qiziljah or Qiziljeh or Qizilja, may refer to:

East Azerbaijan Province
 Qezeljeh, Ahar, East Azerbaijan Province
 Qezeljeh, Bostanabad, East Azerbaijan Province
 Qezelejah Meydan, Bostanabad County, East Azerbaijan Province
 Qezeljeh-ye Arshad, Charuymaq County, East Azerbaijan Province
 Qezeljeh-ye Qeshlaq, Charuymaq County, East Azerbaijan Province
 Qezeljeh-ye Qomeshlu, Charuymaq County, East Azerbaijan Province
 Qezeljeh, Heris, East Azerbaijan Province
 Qezeljeh, Meyaneh, East Azerbaijan Province
 Qezeljeh-ye Akrad, Sarab County, East Azerbaijan Province
 Qezeljeh-ye Sadat, Sarab County, East Azerbaijan Province
 Qezeljeh, Shabestar, East Azerbaijan Province

Hamadan Province
 Qezeljeh, Hajjilu, Hamadan Province
 Qezeljeh, Kuhin, Hamadan Province
 Qezeljeh, Razan, Hamadan Province

Kurdistan Province
 Qezeljeh, Kurdistan, a village in Bijar County
 Qezeljeh Kand, a village in Qorveh County

Markazi Province
 Qezeljeh, Markazi
 Qezeljeh, Arak, Markazi Province

West Azerbaijan Province
 Qezeljeh, Khoy, West Azerbaijan Province
 Qezeljeh, Dizaj, Khoy County, West Azerbaijan province
 Qezeljah, Salmas, West Azerbaijan Province
 Qezeljeh Gol, West Azerbaijan Province
 Qezeljeh Qaleh, West Azerbaijan Province
 Qezeljeh-ye Sofla, West Azerbaijan
 Qezeljeh, Abhar, Zanjan Province
 Qezeljeh, Ijrud, Zanjan Province

Zanjan Province
 Qezeljeh, Mahneshan, Zanjan Province
 Qezeljeh-ye Aq Emam, Golestan Province
 Qezeljeh-ye Pashmak, Golestan Province
 Qezeljeh-ye Olya, Zanjan Province
 Qezeljeh-ye Sofla, Zanjan

See also
 Qezelcheh (disambiguation)